Palissery Narayanankutty Menon alias P. N. Menon (2 January 1926 – 9 September 2008) was an Indian film director and art director in the Malayalam cinema. He is also famous as the Designer of Promotional Posters. Menon was also the uncle of another popular film director Bharathan, being the younger brother of the latter's father. In 2001, he was honoured with the J. C. Daniel Award, Kerala government's highest honour for contributions to Malayalam cinema.

Early life
Born in Wadakkancherry, he completed his studies at Thrissur and from School of Art in Chennai. He came to Chennai when he was only 20 years old. He couldn't find any job in Chennai, so travelled to Salem and become a production boy in a Studio. But, after two-and-a-half years, the studio was shut down and went back to Chennai. He got back to sketches, then painting, then doing magazine covers. One of his designing assignments was for one of Producer B. Nagi Reddy's magazines. The production house was so impressed with his talent that when they bought Vahini Studio in 1951, Nagi Reddy's son appointed him as a paid apprentice in the painting department.

He got a job as an art director in an English play produced by the daughter of the then Andhra Chief Minister. They had three performances in Delhi, one for the then Vice President Dr. Sarvepalli Radhakrishnan, another for then Prime Minister Jawaharlal Nehru and the third for then Army Chief Field Marshal K. M. Cariappa. Ninamaninja Kalpadukal was his first movie Malayalam movie as the art director and his debut in the field of film direction in the 60s with the film Rosie (1965).

Career
Menon's Olavum Theeravum based on M. T. Vasudevan Nair's script and released in 1970. It won the Kerala State Film Award for Best Film. Menon's boldest film is Kuttiyedathi (Eldest Sister), again based on a short story by M. T. Vasudevan Nair.

Perhaps his most successful commercial film was Chembarathi (Hibiscus) which was based on a script by Malayattoor Ramakrishnan and starred newcomers like Raghavan, Sudhir and Roja Ramani (Sobhana) along with veteran actors like Madhu and Rani Chandra. Another script of Malayattoor Ramakrishnan named Gayathri which was directed by him was awarded the President's Special Film Award Medal for National Integration. Menon's film Malamukalile Daivam, has won National Award too.

After a long period of absence lasting more than a decade, he directed a film, Nerkkuneraey ("Face to Face"), in (2004).

Poster Designer

Menon made a name as a versatile Poster Designer as well. He artistic posters always helped the film to gain attention of cinegoers. He has also done posters even for Bollywood films like Anokha Rishta starring Rajesh Khanna. Some of the Malayalam films he had designed posters are Oomakkuyil, Kakkothikkavile Appooppan Thaadikal, Itha Innu Muthal, Poomadhathe Pennu, Aavanazhi, Amrutham Gamaya and Manivathoorile Aayiram Sivarathrikal.

Personal life

His wife's name was Bharathi Menon and they had two daughters, named Rajasree and Jayasree. Popular film director Bharathan was his nephew, and was trained by him in direction. Bharathan predeceased his uncle.

Death
During his last years, Menon lived with his daughter in Kochi. He suffered from many serious illnesses like Alzheimer's disease during this period. Finally, he died on 9 September 2008 aged 82, at a private hospital in Kochi. He was cremated with full state honours at Ravipuram Crematorium the next day.

Awards

Kerala State Film Awards
 1970 – Best Film: Olavum Theeravum
 1972 – Second Best Film: Chembarathi
 1973 – Second Best Film: Gayathri
 1983 – Special Jury Award: Malamukalile Daivam
 2001 – J. C. Daniel Award

National Film Awards
 1973 – Best Feature Film in Malayalam: Gayathri
 1983 – Best Feature Film in Malayalam: Malamukalile Daivam

Filmography

References

20th-century Indian film directors
Malayalam film directors
1928 births
2008 deaths
Kerala State Film Award winners
People from Thrissur district
Indian art directors
Tamil film directors
Film directors from Kerala
J. C. Daniel Award winners